The 2015 Canterbury-Bankstown Bulldogs season is the 81st in the club's history. Coached by Des Hasler and captained by James Graham, who replaces Michael Ennis after his departure from the club. They will compete in the National Rugby League's 2015 Telstra Premiership.  After finishing the 2014 season as the runners up, the team will be aiming to go one step further and win the premiership this year.

Fixtures

Regular season
The Bulldogs will begin the regular season with an away match against the Penrith Panthers on March 8. They will host their first home game against the Parramatta Eels the following week on March 13.

The Club's 80th anniversary will be celebrated with a return to Belmore Sports Ground on July 26 in a match against the Cronulla Sharks.

Finals

Ladder

See also
 List of Canterbury-Bankstown Bulldogs seasons

References

Canterbury-Bankstown Bulldogs seasons
Canterbury-Bankstown Bulldogs season